William Reed may refer to:

 William Reed (athlete) (born 1970), American sprinter
 William Reed (author) (1830–1920), author of The Phantom of the Poles (1906)
 William Reed (British colonial official) (c. 1670–1728), Acting Governor of North-Carolina (1722–1724)
 William Reed (composer) (1910–2002), English composer
 William Reed (musician) (1859–1945), Canadian organist, conductor, and composer
 William Reed (politician) (1776–1837), United States Representative from Massachusetts
 William Reed (publisher) (1830–1920), English trade magazine publisher; founder of William Reed Ltd
 William Reed (RAF officer) (1896–?), British World War I flying ace
 William B. Reed (politician) (1833–1909), mayor of South Norwalk (1891–1893), oyster grower and shipper
 William Bradford Reed (1806–1876), American politician and journalist
 William Henry Reed (1876–1942), violinist and author of Elgar as I Knew Him
 William L. Reed (politician) (born 1866), member of the Massachusetts House of Representatives
 William Maxwell Reed (1871–1962), American writer of science books for children
 William Norman Reed (1917–1944), American fighter ace, Flying Tiger and United States Army Air Corps lieutenant colonel
 William R. Reed (c. 1915–1971), college athletics administrator in the United States
 William Samuel Reed (1864–1941), Progressive party member of the Canadian House of Commons
 William W. Reed (1825–1916), Wisconsin State Senator and Assemblyman
 William Whitaker Reed (1816–1891), Tennessee native and pioneer in the settlement of Bell County, Texas
 Bill Reed (born 1954), retired professional ice hockey defenceman
 Billy Reed (footballer) (1928–2003), Welsh international footballer
 Billy Reed (baseball) (1922–2005), baseball player

Fictional characters
Billie Reed, in the TV drama Days of Our Lives

Companies
 William Reed Ltd, a publisher of trade publications

See also

William Reade (disambiguation)
William Read (disambiguation)
William Reid (disambiguation)
William Rede (disambiguation)